Svíčková, or svíčková na smetaně (pronounced  [ˈsviːt͡ʃkɔvaː na smɛ.ta.ɲɛ]), is a Czech meat dish and one of the most popular Czech and Slovak meals. It is sirloin steak prepared with vegetables (carrots, parsley root, celeriac and onion), spiced with black pepper, allspice, bay leaf and thyme, and boiled with double cream. It is generally served with houskové knedlíky (bread dumplings).

Preparation
Svíčková, or svíčková na smetaně (beef tenderloin), is a typical Czech dish and one of the most popular Czech meals. It is tenderloin boiled or roasted with vegetables (carrots, parsley root, celeriac, and blue onion, red onion, silver onion or pink onion), spiced with black pepper, juniper, allspice, bay leaf, and baked together, then vegetables and gravy are gathered, mashed/mixed with sour double cream and boiled for sauce. It is generally served with bread dumplings (houskové knedlíky), whipped cream and cranberry sauce. In most restaurants and canteens the staff actually boil the beef and vegetables together in one pot, instead of roasting it.

Varieties
Svíčková na smetaně is served with a cream (smetana) topping and usually with cranberry sauce and slice of lemon in many restaurants around the Czech Republic.

Bohemian immigrants to the United States following the First World War have passed on an older variation of the dish to subsequent generations, while regional tastes and product availability have influenced its preparation. Svíčková made in the Chicago area, for example, rarely includes vegetables in its final presentation, but instead incorporates them into a vinegar-based marinade suffused with crushed allspice and bay leaves.

Vegetarian restaurants in the Czech Republic also prepare the dish without the use of meat. Instead, they use a vegetarian sirloin usually made from soy, and the broth does not contain meat.

See also
Czech cuisine

References

External links

 Czech Svickova
 Czech-American Svickova

Czech cuisine
Czech-American cuisine
Beef dishes
National dishes
Cranberries